Satenik or Satana was the name of the princess who married Artashes, the king of Armenia. Their love story, known as Artashes and Satenik, is presented by the Armenian historian Movses Khorenatsi in his History of Armenia. Movses noted that the story, which he directly quotes from, was a well-known epic during his time among the common people of Armenia told by traveling storytellers and minstrels.

Background
Artashes, whose name is also seen in the Greek form as Artaxias, had risen to the throne of Armenia in around 189 BC and was recognized as such by both Rome and Parthia. The invasion of the Kingdom of Armenia by the Alans during the reign of King Artashes I (189–159 BC) serves as the backdrop of the romantic tale between Artashes and Satenik. Following their conquering of the lands of Iberia, the Alans moved further southwards, crossing the Kura River and, effectively, into Armenia. Artashes gathered a large force to meet the Alanian threat and a fierce war took place between the two sides, resulting in the capture of the young son of the Alanian king. The Alans were forced to retreat back to the Kur river and there they set up a base camp on the northern side of the river. Meanwhile, Artashes' army pursued them and established their camp on the southern side of the Kur. The Alanian king asked for an eternal peace treaty to be concluded between his people and the Armenians and promised to give Artashes anything he wanted so long as he would release his son, but the Armenian king refused to do so.

Romance with Artashes
At this time, Satenik came near the shore and, through an interpreter, called on Artashes to release her brother: 

   
Hearing these words, Artashes traveled down to the river and upon seeing Satenik, was immediately captivated by her beauty. Artashes called on one of his close military commanders, Smbat Bagratuni, and confessing his desire for Satenik, expressed his willingness to conclude the treaty with the Alans and ordered Smbat to bring her to him. Smbat dispatched messengers to the Alanian king, who gave the following reply:

Artashes remained undaunted and instead sought to abduct Satenik since bride abductions were considered more honorable during this period than formal acquiescence:

Marriage
Following Satenik's abduction, Artashes agreed to pay to the Alans vast amounts of gold and red leather, the latter of which, was highly valued material among the Alans. With this, the two kings concluded a peace treaty and a lavish and magnificent wedding took place. Movses stated that during the wedding a "golden shower rained down" on Artashes and a "pearl shower" rained down on Satenik. It was a popular tradition among the Armenian kings, according to Movses, to stand in front of the entrance of a temple and drop money from above his head and to shower the queen's bedroom with pearls. They had six sons: Artavasdes (Artavazd), Vruyr, Mazhan, Zariadres (Zareh), Tiran and Tigranes (Tigran). The Artashesyan, or Artaxiad, dynasty lasted until the beginning of the next century, expiring in around 14 AD.

Later life
The later relationship between Artashes and Satenik remains largely unknown. Early on in History of Armenia, Movses had stated that Satenik had fallen in love with Argavan, a descendant of a race of dragons (vishaps, in Armenian), but the remainder of the story that was sung by the minstrels is missing and believed to be lost.

Bibliography

Notes

Alanic women
Armenian queens consort